Giles Conservation Park is a protected area in the Australian state of South Australia located approximately  east of the state capital of Adelaide. Previously, the land was the eastern portion of the Horsnell Gully Conservation Park. It was named after the family of Charles Giles who is reported as being a pioneer in the fields of horticulture and floriculture in South Australia.	

The conservation park features remnant native vegetation and native animals such as Western grey kangaroos and koalas.  It features one walking trail that is part of the Mount Lofty to Norton Summit portion of the Heysen and  Yurrebilla trails.  The official brochure suggests that the conservation park offers ‘excellent opportunities for bushwalking, birdwatching, photography, painting and nature study."

The conservation park is classified as an IUCN Category III protected area.

See also
 Protected areas of South Australia

References

External links
Horsnell Gully and Giles Conservation Parks official webpage
Friends of Black Hill and Morialta Incorporated
Giles Conservation Park webpage on Protected Planet website
Giles Conservation Park webpage on the BirdsSA website

Conservation parks of South Australia
2007 establishments in Australia
Protected areas established in 2007